A derrick is a lifting device, especially in an oil field. The word may also refer to:

Derrick (name)
Derrick (TV series), a German television series
Derrick Comedy, a comedy group of film students and writers based in New York City

See also
Derricks (disambiguation)